Leopoldo Di Martino (born 10 February 1949 in Rovereto is a sailor from Italy, who represented his country at the 1976 Summer Olympics in Kingston, Ontario, Canada as crew member in the Soling. With helmsman Fabio Albarelli and fellow crew member Gianfranco Oradini, they took the 15th place.

Sources
 

Living people
1949 births
Sailors at the 1976 Summer Olympics – Soling
Olympic sailors of Italy
People from Rovereto
Italian male sailors (sport)
Sportspeople from Trentino